"Halo" is a song by rock band Soil and the first single from their studio album Scars. The video is filmed in a rundown house, lit by lamps and sunlight through boarded-up windows. Towards the end of the video, the band can be seen walking on the walls and ceiling, when their instruments begin to break, seemingly through the violence of their performance. "Halo" is listed as the top Soil song on iTunes.

Track listing
 "Halo" (radio mix) - 2:53
 "Center" (previously unreleased) - 2:53
 "Halo (Arms Remix)" - 2:53
 "Halo" (music video) - 2:58

Charts

References 

2001 singles
Soil (American band) songs
2001 songs
J Records singles
Song recordings produced by Johnny K
Songs written by Ryan McCombs